Chapan-e Sofla (also Romanized as Chāpān-e Soflá and Chāpān Soflá; also known as Chāpān and Chāpān-e Pā’īn) is a village in Emam Rural District, Ziviyeh District, Saqqez County, Kurdistan Province, Iran. At the 2006 census, its population was 214, in 48 families. The village is populated by Kurds.

References 

Towns and villages in Saqqez County
Kurdish settlements in Kurdistan Province